The Mercedes-Benz EQG is a future electric mid-size four-wheel drive luxury SUV produced by German automobile manufacturer Mercedes-Benz. It is part of the EQ family, a range that will expand to include 10 new models by 2022. The EQG is based on the existing conventional ICE powered second-generation Mercedes G-Class.

On 5 September 2021, Mercedes-Benz previewed Concept EQG, the G-Class concept car with full electric drive, at IAA Mobility 2021 in Munich. Externally, Concept EQG carries the styling of the second generation G-Class, with updated elements to distinguish the electric variant, such as a square tire cover, extensive additional LED lighting including a LED Black Panel grille, updated front and rear fascias, new 22-inch wheels, and special roof rack. While Mercedes-Benz has not revealed the technical data yet, Concept EQG has four electric motors that are placed closer to the wheels and that can operate independently; the battery packs are 108 kWH. Additionally, a two-speed gearbox allows the gear reductions for the off-road travel. The model names are EQG 560 4MATIC and EQG 580 4MATIC, as well as a rumored AMG variant. The production version is confirmed for 2024.

References

EQG
Upcoming car models
Mercedes-EQ